TER Auvergne-Rhône-Alpes is the regional rail network serving the region of Auvergne-Rhône-Alpes, central and eastern France. It is operated by the French national railway company SNCF. It was formed in 2017 from the previous TER networks TER Auvergne and TER Rhône-Alpes, after the respective regions were merged.

Network

The northeastern part of the region is also served by the Léman Express network. The TER Auvergne-Rhône-Alpes rail and bus network as of April 2022:

Rail

Bus

See also

Réseau Ferré de France
List of SNCF stations in Auvergne-Rhône-Alpes

References

 
Rail transport in Auvergne-Rhône-Alpes